Cristian Savani (born 22 February 1982) is an Italian volleyball player, a member of Italy men's national volleyball team in 2001–2013 and Italian club BluVolley Verona, a medalist of the Olympic Games (silver in 2004, bronze in 2012), 2012 Italian Champion, double Chinese Champion (2015, 2016).

He announced his retirement as professional volleyball player on 01 May, 2020 on his instagram account.

Career
Cristian Savani in National team and Serie A1 plays since 2001. In the Italian league his debut was in team from Montichiari from which went for two years to Itas Diatec Trentino and first national team match against Bulgaria.

Personal life
Savani was born in Castiglione delle Stiviere, Italy. He is married to Mihaela Travica (Dragan's sister, Ljubomir's daughter). On 4 April 2013 his wife gave birth to their first child - daughter named Mia.

Sporting achievements

Clubs

CEV Cup
 2007/2008  with M. Roma Volley

Challenge Cup
 2009/2010  with Sir Safety Perugia
 2010/2011  with Lube Banca Macerata

AVC Asian Club Championship
  2014 - with Fudan University Shanghai

National championships
 2011/2012  Italian Championship, with Lube Banca Macerata
 2012/2013  Italian SuperCup 2012, with Lube Banca Macerata
 2013/2014  Chinese Championship, with Fudan University Shanghai
 2014/2015  Chinese Championship, with Fudan University Shanghai
 2015/2016  Chinese Championship, with Fudan University Shanghai

National team
 2003  FIVB World League
 2003  CEV European Championship
 2004  Olympic Games
 2005  CEV European Championship
 2011  CEV European Championship
 2012  Olympic Games
 2013  FIVB World League
 2013  CEV European Championship

Individually
 2009 Memorial of Hubert Jerzy Wagner - Best Spiker
 2010 CEV Challenge Cup - Best Server
 2011 Memorial of Hubert Jerzy Wagner - Most Valuable Player
 2011 World Cup - Best Server
 2012 Olympic Games London - Best Server
 2014 Asian Club Championship - Best Outside Spikers
 2015 CVL League - Best Outside Spikers
 2015 CVL League - Most Valuable Player

References

External links
 LegaVolley Serie A player profile

1982 births
Living people
People from Castiglione delle Stiviere
Italian men's volleyball players
Olympic volleyball players of Italy
Volleyball players at the 2012 Summer Olympics
Medalists at the 2012 Summer Olympics
Olympic bronze medalists for Italy
Olympic medalists in volleyball
Italian Champions of men's volleyball
Sportspeople from the Province of Mantua